Sri Vishwesha Tirtharu, officially known as   (27 April 1931 – 29 December 2019), was an Indian Hindu guru, saint and presiding swamiji of the Sri Pejavara Adokshaja Matha, one of the Ashta Mathas belonging to the Dvaita school of philosophy founded by Sri Madhvacharya. 

Sri Vishvesha Tirtharu was the 32nd in the lineage of the Pejavara matha, starting from Sri Adhokshaja Tirtharu, who was one of the direct disciples of Sri Madhvacharya. He was the honorary president of Vishva Tulu Sammelana. He had established Poornaprajna Vidyapeetha in Bangalore which has completed over 63 years. Many scholars are trained here on Vedanta. He has also conducted 38 Nyayasudamangalas - graduations for Poornaprajna Vidyapeetha students. He was awarded the Padma Vibhushan India's second highest civilian award posthumously in 2020 for his work and service towards the society.

Life 
Shri Vishvesha Tirtharu was born on 27 April 1931 in Ramakunja to a brahmin  family and his pre-sannyasa name was Venkatrama. He was ordained into sannyasa at the young age of 7 years in 1938. His vidya guru is Shri Vidyamanya Tirtharu of Shri Bhandarkeri Math, and Shri Palimaru Math also. He appointed Shri Vishwaprasanna Tirtha as his successor sanyasi Swamiji of Shri Pejawar Math.

On 29 December 2019, Sri Vishvesha Tirtharu bid farewell to this material world & left for spiritual abode.

Paryaya of Swamiji 

The Swamiji assumed first Paryaya, turn to worship Lord Krishna at Udupi, at a young age. During his first Paryaya in 1954, he organized the All India Madhva Conference in Udupi. During his second Paryaya in 1968, he got the Badagumalige in Udupi repaired. During his third tenure as Paryaya Swamiji in 1984, he has got a new hall built at Udupi called Krishna Dhama.
He has completed five Paryayas and only one to complete five Paryayas after Shri Vadiraja Swamiji of Sodhe Mutt. He started his fifth Paryaya on January 18, 2016 and completed it on January 18, 2018.

Social services of Swamiji 

The swamiji was involved in various social service organisations, and is said to have started many educational and social service organisations.

The Akhila Bharat Madhwa Maha Mandala ABMM center started by the Swami is said to have helped many poor students. He has established math centres at various holy places in India. These centres are of great help to many pilgrims.

The Akhila Bharat Madhwa Maha Mandala [ABMM] has many hostels all over Karnataka at places like Bengaluru, Hubli, Dharwad, Kalaburgi, Bagalkot to name a few. These hostels give preference to very-poor students and give them accommodation and food almost free. For normal students it charges a very nominal monthly charge to run its various activities. These hostels have the same feeling as Mutts as in the students start their daily activities with Vishnu Sahasranam in morning and then wearing traditional white dhoti during lunch and dinner. The food provided is of Satwik nature and so it doesn't consist of non-vegetarian foods, onions and garlic.

He was strongly rooted in Brahmin  causes such as protection of cow and played an active role in the Ramjanmabhoomi movement. Yet, he boldly organised Iftar for the Muslims during Ramzan at the ancient Sri Krishna math complex in Udupi. He advocated Vishva Hindu Parishad (VHP) and was at the forefront in supporting the Ram Janmabhoomi movement. He has also led the Go Raksha (Sanskrit: Cow protection) movement.

Sri Vishvesha Tirtharu has ordained Sri Vishvaprasanna Tirtharu as his successor to the Pejavara matha in 1988.

Sahasra Chandra Darshana Shanthi was celebrated for Sri Vishvesha Tirtha Swamiji in Tirumala kshetra on March 7, 2012 in the presence of several peethadipathis.

His fourth tenure was in 2000 and his fifth tenure was in 2016.

After Narendra Modi's electoral victory and assumption of the office of Prime Minister of India, Sri Vishvesha Tirtha Swamiji called on him, and blessed him to serve the people with courage and compassion.

Illness and Death 

Sri Vishwesha Teertha Swamiji was admitted to Manipal, Kasturba Medical College (KMC) Hospital on 20 December when Swamiji faced severe difficulty in breathing. The doctors reported blockage of lungs by dry cough and was supported by ventilators and other life supporting devices.

On 27 December, the doctors released a bulletin saying the seer's brain functioning was deteriorating. On the early morning of 29 December, Swamiji was shifted to the Pejawara Matha as per the seer's desire of spending the last moments in the holy Mutt.

On the same day of 29 December, Swamiji died. The chief minister, B. S. Yediyurappa, announced three days of mourning throughout the state in respect to the seer's demise.

Later Swamiji's mortal remains were kept in Udupi for the devotees and later moved to national college grounds in Bangalore by a helicopter. With all the government honours and respects, Swamiji was buried in Vidyapeetha mutt, Banashankari and the burial ground is honorifically called "Brundavana".

See also
 Dvaita
 Works of Madhvacharya

References 

 
 Sri Pejavara Adhokshaja Matha

External links
 Achievements of Sri Sri Vishvesha Theertha Swamiji and photo collections
 Sri Sri Vishvesha Theertha Swamiji's official website
 Everyone will become minority one day - Pejawar Swamiji

1931 births
2019 deaths
Dvaita Vedanta
Indian Hindu saints
Madhva religious leaders
Dvaitin philosophers
Indian Vaishnavites
People from Udupi
Tulu people
20th-century Hindu religious leaders
Deaths from pneumonia in India
Recipients of the Padma Vibhushan in other fields